Jack Edwin "Jock" Harper (8 April 1914 – 17 January 2005) was an Australian amateur tennis player who competed mainly in the 1930s and 1940s. He reached the quarterfinals of the Australian Championships in 1946 and was runner-up in the men's doubles in 1937 partnering John Bromwich.

In April 1946 Harper lost just a single point when he defeated J. Sandiford 6–0, 6–0 at the Surrey Open Hard Court Championships in a match that lasted 18 minutes, the shortest singles match on record.

Grand Slam finals

Doubles: (1 runner-up)

References

External links
 

1914 births
2005 deaths
Australian male tennis players
Tennis players from Melbourne
20th-century Australian people